The AARP Movies for Grownups Award for Best Foreign Film is one of the AARP Movies for Grownups Awards presented annually by the AARP. The award honors the best film in the English language that is made by or focuses on people over the age of 50. The Best Foreign Film Award is one of the seven original trophies issued by AARP the Magazine, along with awards for Best Movie for Grownups, Best Director, Best Actor, Best Actress, Best Documentary, and Best Movie for Grownups Who Refuse to Grow Up.

The exact name of the award has shifted occasionally throughout its history. At the 1st AARP Movies for Grownups Awards, it was referred to as Best Foreign Film. In some years, it was referred to as Best Foreign Language Film instead. In 2021, the AARP titled the award "Best Foreign Film/Best International Film," mirroring the Academy of Motion Picture Arts and Sciences's shift that year from Best Foreign Language Feature Film to Best International Feature Film. They returned to the title Best Foreign Film the next year.

Winners and Nominees

2000s

2010s

2020s

Awards and Nominations by Country

The following countries received three or more nominations for Best Foreign Film:

The following directors received multiple Best Foreign Film nominations:

References

Foreign Film